Rodrigo Nascimento França, known as Rodrigo Becão (born 19 January 1996) is a Brazilian professional footballer who plays as a defender for Italian Serie A club Udinese.

Club career
Becão made his Campeonato Brasileiro Série B debut for Bahia on 28 November 2015 in a game against Atlético Goianiense.

On 4 July 2018, Becão joined the Russian Premier League club PFC CSKA Moscow on loan for the 2018–19 season. He made his first appearance for CSKA on 27 July 2018, in their 2018 Russian Super Cup victory over Lokomotiv Moscow.

On 6 July 2019, Rodrigo Becão signed to Italian Serie A side Udinese for €1.6 million. On 25 August 2019, Becão scored the winning goal on his Serie A debut in a 1–0 victory over A.C. Milan at Dacia Arena.

Career statistics

Club

Honours
Bahia
 Copa do Nordeste: 2017
 Campeonato Baiano: 2018

CSKA Moscow
 Russian Super Cup: 2018

References

External links
 

1996 births
Sportspeople from Salvador, Bahia
Living people
Brazilian footballers
Association football defenders
Esporte Clube Bahia players
PFC CSKA Moscow players
Udinese Calcio players
Campeonato Brasileiro Série A players
Campeonato Brasileiro Série B players
Russian Premier League players
Serie A players
Brazilian expatriate footballers
Expatriate footballers in Russia
Expatriate footballers in Italy